Josip Tomašević (born 4 March 1994) is a Croatian professional footballer who plays as a left back for Bulgarian First League club Lokomotiv Plovdiv.

Honours

Club
Lokomotiv Plovdiv
 Bulgarian Cup (2): 2018–19, 2019–20
 Bulgarian Supercup: 2020

References

External links
 

1994 births
Living people
People from Sinj
Association football fullbacks
Croatian footballers
Croatia youth international footballers
RNK Split players
NK Imotski players
NK Dugopolje players
HNK Cibalia players
PFC Lokomotiv Plovdiv players
Atromitos F.C. players
First Football League (Croatia) players
Croatian Football League players
First Professional Football League (Bulgaria) players
Super League Greece players
Croatian expatriate footballers
Expatriate footballers in Bulgaria
Croatian expatriate sportspeople in Bulgaria
Expatriate footballers in Greece
Croatian expatriate sportspeople in Greece